Giovanni Stefano Verdura was a 17th-century Italian painter of the Baroque period, mainly active in Genoa and later in the Piedmont. He was a disciple of the Genoese painter Domenico Fiasella. He died of the plague in 1657.

Sources
.

1657 deaths
17th-century Italian painters
Italian male painters
Painters from Genoa
Painters from Piedmont
Italian Baroque painters
17th-century deaths from plague (disease)
Year of birth unknown